Längenfeldgasse  is a station on  and  of the Vienna U-Bahn. It is located in the Meidling District. It opened in 1989.

References

External links 
 

Buildings and structures in Meidling
Railway stations opened in 1989
Vienna U-Bahn stations
1989 establishments in Austria
Railway stations in Austria opened in the 20th century